Edward Rambach Pressman (April 11, 1943 – January 17, 2023) was an American film producer and founder of the production company Edward R. Pressman Film Corporation.

Pressman was born to a Jewish family in New York City, the son of Lynn and Jack Pressman, known as the "King of Marbles", who founded the Pressman Toy Corporation.

In 1987, his own production company Edward R. Pressman Film Corporation had received a three-feature pact with International Video Entertainment to handle theatrical and home video distribution rights with a dual option to extend into a fourth feature.

The Academy Film Archive houses the Edward R. Pressman Collection. The film collection contains over 250 items, including theatrical prints, printing elements and videotapes related to the films produced by Pressman or his production company, as well as films acquired by Pressman Films for reference purposes. The Pressman Collection is complemented by paper materials held at the Academy's Margaret Herrick Library.

Pressman died in Los Angeles on January 17, 2023, at the age of 79. His death was confirmed by his production company.

Filmography
As an actor

Music department

Miscellaneous crew

Thanks

References

External links
 

1943 births
2023 deaths
Film producers from New York (state)
Businesspeople from New York City
20th-century American Jews
21st-century American Jews